Frozen Man Creek is a stream in the U.S. state of South Dakota. It is a tributary of Plum Creek.

Frozen Man Creek received its name from an incident, when a party of people froze to death near it.

See also
List of rivers of South Dakota

References

Rivers of Stanley County, South Dakota
Rivers of South Dakota